Saint Kitts and Nevis competed at the 2022 World Aquatics Championships in Budapest, Hungary from 18 June to 3 July.

Swimming

Swimmers from Saint Kitts and Nevis have achieved qualifying standards in the following events.

References

Nations at the 2022 World Aquatics Championships
Swimming in Saint Kitts and Nevis
2022 in Saint Kitts and Nevis